Walter Ziegler (born 16 July 1937) is a German historian

Life 
Born in Liberec, Ziegler has been lining in Bavaria since 1946. He attended Gymnasium in Munich. He passed the first Staatsexamen in 1964, the second in 1966. After his doctorate and his habilitation with Andreas Kraus with the work Studien zum Staatshaushalt Bayerns in der zweiten Hälfte des 15. Jahrhunderts at the University of Regensburg in 1980, he received a professorship for modern history and regional history as well as didactics of history at the University of Würzburg. In 2001 he was awarded the Bavarian Order of Merit.

The focus of his academic work is the history of the State, especially of Bavaria and southern Germany, in the late Middle Ages and early modern times. Another focus of his research is Reformation and Counter-Reformation. He has also published several works on the contemporary history of Bavaria in the 20th century, especially on the period of National Socialism and displacement.

Writings 
Monographs
 Hitler und Bayern. Beobachtungen zu ihrem Verhältnis. (Bayerische Akademie der Wissenschaften. Philosophisch-Historische Klasse. Sitzungsberichte. Jg. 2004, H. 4). Beck, Munich 2004, .
 Studien zum Staatshaushalt Bayerns in der zweiten Hälfte des 15. Jahrhunderts. Die regulären Kammereinkünfte des Herzogtums Niederbayern 1450–1500. Beck, Munich 1981,  (in the meantime: Regensburg, Universität, Habilitations-Schrift, 1976).

Editions
 with Anton Schindling: Die Territorien des Reichs im Zeitalter der Reformation und Konfessionalisierung. 7 volumes. Aschendorff, Münster 1989–1997;
 Vol. 1: Der Südosten (Katholisches Leben und Kirchenreform im Zeitalter der Glaubensspaltung. 49). 1989, ;
 Vol. 2: Der Nordosten (Katholisches Leben und Kirchenreform im Zeitalter der Glaubensspaltung. 50). 1990, ;
 Vol. 3: Der Nordwesten (Katholisches Leben und Kirchenreform im Zeitalter der Glaubensspaltung. 51). 1991, ;
 Vol. 4: Mittleres Deutschland (Katholisches Leben und Kirchenreform im Zeitalter der Glaubensspaltung. 52). 1992, ;
 Vol. 5: Der Südwesten (Katholisches Leben und Kirchenreform im Zeitalter der Glaubensspaltung. 53). 1993, ;
 Vol. 6: Nachträge (Katholisches Leben und Kirchenreform im Zeitalter der Glaubensspaltung. 56). 1996, ;
 Vol. 7: Bilanz – Forschungsperspektiven – Register (Katholisches Leben und Kirchenreform im Zeitalter der Glaubensspaltung. 57). 1997, .
 with Hermann Rumschötel: Staat und Gaue in der NS-Zeit. Bayern 1933–1945.(. Beiheft. Reihe B, 21). Beck, Munich 2004, .
 Die Vertriebenen vor der Vertreibung. Die Heimatländer der deutschen Vertriebenen im 19. und 20. Jahrhundert.2 vol. Iudicium, Munich 1999, .

References

External links 
 
 Walter Ziegler on Webarchiv
 Seite an der Universität München

1937 births
Living people
Writers from Liberec
20th-century German historians
Academic staff of the Ludwig Maximilian University of Munich
Academic staff of the University of Würzburg
Members of the Bavarian Academy of Sciences
Sudeten German people